Francisco Javier Nevárez Pulgarín (born 3 December 2000) is a Mexican professional footballer who plays as a defender for Liga MX club Juárez.

Career statistics

Club

References

External links
 
 
 
 

2000 births
Living people
Association football midfielders
Liga MX players
FC Juárez footballers
Footballers from Chihuahua
Sportspeople from Ciudad Juárez
Mexican footballers